Characters is the twenty-first studio album by American singer-songwriter Stevie Wonder, released in late 1987. The album features six singles including the Grammy-nominated "Skeletons" (#19) and "You Will Know" (#77), which both reached number one on the Billboard R&B Singles chart (the former being the most-recent American top 40 hit of Wonder's career). The album also contained a duet with Michael Jackson, "Get It" (#80), that was a minor hit.

Overview
Although highly anticipated like his last album, 1985's In Square Circle, upon its release, the album received mixed reviews from critics, and debuted at number 17 on the US Billboard 200. It became Wonder's first album since Music of My Mind not to reach the top ten of the charts. In the UK, it also fared less well, reaching only #33, the first album to miss the top 20 since Music of My Mind which failed to chart in 1972.

It also debuted at number one on the Top R&B Albums chart for seven weeks, and spawned six singles including three that hit the Billboard Hot 100 - "Get It" (#80) (duet with Michael Jackson), "Skeletons" (#19) and the ballad "You Will Know" (#77) that had attained Billboard R&B chart success. Two other singles hit the R&B chart - "My Eyes Don't Cry" (#6, R&B) and "With Each Beat of My Heart" (#28, R&B). The final single, "Free", hit #49 on the UK chart.

Cash Box said that "My Eyes Don't Cry" is "not [Wonder's] greatest song, but is definitely an exciting track with a powerful delivery by Wonder on vocals."

Awards and nominations
The album earned Wonder three Grammy Award nominations in 1988–89. The album's first single, "Skeletons" received two nominations for Best R&B Song and Best Male R&B Vocal Performance at the 30th Grammy Awards, losing to Bill Wither's "Lean On Me" and Smokey Robinson's "Just to See Her" respectively. Characters received a nomination at the 31st Grammy Awards for Best Male R&B Vocal Performance, losing to Terence Trent D'Arby's debut Introducing the Hardline According to Terence Trent D'Arby.

To promote the album, Wonder performed a one-hour Characters special on MTV, in which he also performed unreleased material as well as a duet with Stevie Ray Vaughan.

Track listing
All songs written by Stevie Wonder, except where noted.
Side one
"You Will Know" - 5:00
"Dark 'n' Lovely" (Gary Byrd, Stevie Wonder) - 4:39
"In Your Corner" - 4:30
"With Each Beat of My Heart" - 5:28
"One of a Kind" - 5:10
Side two
"Skeletons" - 5:24
"Get It" (duet with Michael Jackson) - 4:33
"Galaxy Paradise" - 3:51
"Cryin' Through the Night" - 5:48
"Free" - 4:12
CD bonus tracks
"Come Let Me Make Your Love Come Down" (featuring B.B. King & Stevie Ray Vaughan) - 5:20
"My Eyes Don't Cry" - 7:05

Personnel 
 Stevie Wonder – synthesizers (tracks 1–4, 6–7, 9, 11), bass synth (1, 9), synth horns (12), piano (9–10), keyboards (including harpsichord – 10), lead vocals (all tracks), background vocals (tracks 1–2, 4, 7), bass (tracks 2, 7–8, 11–12), drums (1–2, 4–9), percussion (1–2, 4, 6–7), strings (1), bells (1), drum machine (3), harmonica (5)
Michael Jackson – lead vocals (track 7)
Stevie Ray Vaughan – guitar (track 11)
B.B. King – guitar (track 11)
Mary Lee Evans - backing vocals (7, 9)
 Ben Bridges - electric guitar (track 7)
 Gary Olazabal – engineer, associate producer, mixing, keyboard programming (all tracks)

Charts

Weekly charts

Certifications

See also
 List of number-one R&B albums of 1987 (U.S.)
 List of number-one R&B albums of 1988 (U.S.)

References

Stevie Wonder albums
1987 albums
Motown albums
Albums produced by Stevie Wonder